Lewisburg is an unincorporated community in Miami Township, Cass County, Indiana.

History
Lewisburg had its start in the year 1835 by the building of the Wabash and Erie Canal through that territory. It was named for its founder, Lewis Bowyer (or Boyer).

A post office was established at Lewisburg in 1835, and remained in operation until 1868.

Geography

References

Unincorporated communities in Cass County, Indiana
Unincorporated communities in Indiana